A content designer is tasked with communicating information in the best way possible. An effective content designer is expected to be skilled in language(s), graphic design, and the technical requirements of front-end development. A content designer is an expert across various media, and is skilled in drafting compelling text, images, and videos.

An effective content designer is also a strong researcher. Content designers research the audience so that they can design effective content for them. They serve as advocates for users in the engineering and design processes. They try to make it simple for that audience to find the content they need. They also manage the content to keep it useful and up to date.

The term "content designer" originated in big technology, however, it is also used in online marketing, sound design, or government publishing. Content designers can work on the web, in print, or on digital services and applications.

Content design in government

Content designers working for government have to explain complicated information as clearly as possible. It is a form of User centred design.

Content design is not editorial writing. According to Sarah Winters (was Richards) of Content Design London:

Content designers use data and testing to understand what people need and then try to meet those needs. This can help citizens understand their rights and obligations, and use government services.

Content designers make information easy to find, simple to understand, and accessible to everyone. 

Content designer is a defined role in the UK government civil service and in the Australian government. In the UK government:

In Singapore, the Design Skills Framework includes the roles of Content writer and Content strategist, rather than a Content designer.

Content design in marketing
Content designers are often involved in online marketing, and usually focus on animated graphics, texts, videos, and sound depending on the message and the target audience. Most content designers produce their own content from scratch and work on their project individually, often using social media. The duties of a content designer vary, depending on the type of company, and the projects they are developing. The format of the content usually specifies a more specific title such as animator for motion graphics, writer for textual content, instructional designer for educational content, or a programmer for automated program/data-driven content. Most content designers must create or draw original work which is relevant to a specific topic or message they wish to communicate. An important function of this job type is being able to adapt to new advances in coding and design. Content designers also create new codes and templates, and often keep themselves updated by acquiring new technical skills.

Web developer vs. web designer
Content designers who specialize in programming might deliberate the role of a web developer versus web designer. Web developers deal with the non-design aspect of building websites, which includes coding and writing markup and site hierarchy, including: client-side coding, server-side coding, and database technology. Web developers require a more intense education than web designers in order to create a website. Generally, web developers excel at coding and the technical aspects of web programming. Web designers create content, whereas web developers must create code that is easy to read; together they create user-friendly, and an overall enjoyable experience for the user to navigate.

Web designers use graphics and graphic design software to create visuals for a website. They then use coding to make it available online. Designers are creative and use both intuition and imagination. However, web designers express more concern with the look of a website than how technically sound it is. They often rely on a web developer to build a website from the ground up and know all the specific languages for that website.

Overall, online representation of a business through websites as a result of web development has made an impact on modern day society. Web developing serves a platform to promote online marketing for a business allowing it to gain global exposure. Millions of online users are able to engage with their favorite businesses thanks to web developing.

Web design and development introduce a convenient way to maneuver through websites. A simple design that easily engages users is an effective outcome. Web designs are constantly updated in order to stay relevant for its users. The aesthetic of a website translates how well users are attracted to use a website.

See also
 Communication design
 Content management
 Content strategy
 Copywriter
 Graphic designer
 Interaction design
 Service design
 Technical writer
 User centred design
 User experience design

References

Usability
Content designers